English actor, comedian, singer, writer, producer, and television host James Corden has received many awards and nominations over his career.

Major Associations

BAFTA Awards

Golden Globe Awards

Primetime Emmy Awards

Tony Awards

Others (Complete List)

References

External links
 

Corden, James
The Late Late Show with James Corden